Kalavar King is a 2010 Indian Telugu-language film directed by Suresh starring Nikhil Siddharth and Shweta Prasad. The film was released on 26 February 2010. The film was remade in Tamil as Eththan by the same director. It was also remade in Kannada as Melkote Manja directed by Jaggesh in 2017.

Plot
Rajesh (Nikhil Siddharth) is a not-so-innocent village boy who wants to make it big in life easily and in the process ends up taking loans from every person in the village. In a parallel track, we have Shruthi (Shweta Prasad) who is being harassed by the local goon Narender (Ajay) who also happens to be her brother-in-law. Rajesh & Shruthi meet and a couple of misunderstandings lead to Rajesh turning over a new leaf. He then transforms into a successful loan recovery agent and decides to rescue Shruthi from the clutches of her brother-in-law. Eventually, they realize their love for each other before an insipid climax leads to a happy ending for them and the audience!

Cast 
 Nikhil Siddharth as Rajesh
 Shweta Prasad as Shruthi
 Ajay as Narender
 Suman Setty
 Y. Kasi Viswanath as Rajesh's father
 Pragathi as Rajesh's mother
 Ali
 Raghu Babu
 Dharmavarapu Subramanyam
 Venu Madhav as Veera Simham
 Ahuti Prasad
 Duvvasi Mohan
 Satya

Soundtrack
The Music Was Composed By Anil.R and Released by Aditya Music.

References

2010s Telugu-language films
Indian comedy-drama films
Telugu films remade in other languages